Sartain may refer to:

Dan Sartain, U.S. rock musician 
Gailard Sartain (born 1946), U.S. actor
John Sartain (1808–1897), U.S. engraver, publisher of Sartain's Magazine, first to print certain poems by Edgar Allan Poe
Emily Sartain (1841–1927), his daughter, U.S. engraver 
William Sartain 1843–1924), his son, U.S. artist 
J. Peter Sartain (born 1952), U.S. Roman Catholic prelate

Also
Sartain Hall, erected 1962 at Troy University, Alabama

Surnames